Jörgen Sundelin (born 15 March 1945) is a retired Swedish sailor. Together with his brothers Peter and Ulf he won a gold medal in the 5.5 metre class at the 1968 Olympics and a silver medal at the 1969 World Championships. The brothers also won the 1971 world title in the three-person keelboat (Dragon class) and placed sixth and ninth at the 1972 and 1976 Olympics, respectively. Besides sailing Jörgen and Peter also played ice hockey for Skuru IK.

References

1945 births
Living people
Swedish male sailors (sport)
Olympic sailors of Sweden
Sailors at the 1968 Summer Olympics – 5.5 Metre
Sailors at the 1972 Summer Olympics – Dragon
Sailors at the 1976 Summer Olympics – Soling
Olympic gold medalists for Sweden
Olympic medalists in sailing
Soling class sailors
Royal Swedish Yacht Club sailors
Medalists at the 1968 Summer Olympics
Sportspeople from Stockholm